Sir Richard Courtenay Musgrave, 11th Baronet (21 August 1838 – 13 February 1881) was an English Conservative Party politician who sat in the House of Commons from 1880 to 1881. He was educated at Eton College and was an officer in the 71st Highlanders. In 1872, he inherited the baronetcy on the death of his father. He was a JP and Deputy Lieutenant for Cumberland and became Lord Lieutenant of Westmorland in 1876.

Musgrave stood unsuccessfully for parliament at East Cumberland in 1874 and 1876. He was elected as one of the two Members of Parliament (MPs) for East Cumberland at the 1880 general election, but died the following year at the age of 42.

Family 

Musgrave was the son of Sir George Musgrave, 10th Baronet and his wife Charlotte Graham, daughter of Sir James Graham, 1st Baronet, of Netherby.

Musgrave married Adora Frances Olga Wells, daughter of Peter Wells, of Windsor Forest and Great Park in 1867.

References

External links
 

1838 births
1881 deaths
People educated at Eton College
Deputy Lieutenants of Cumberland
Baronets in the Baronetage of England
Conservative Party (UK) MPs for English constituencies
UK MPs 1880–1885
Lord-Lieutenants of Westmorland
71st Highlanders officers